Donald McKinley Glover Jr. (born September 25, 1983), also known by his stage name Childish Gambino, is an American actor, comedian, singer, rapper, writer, director, and producer. After working in Derrick Comedy while studying at New York University, Glover was hired at age 23 by Tina Fey as a writer for the NBC sitcom 30 Rock. He later rose to fame for portraying college student Troy Barnes on the NBC sitcom Community from 2009 to 2014. From 2016 to 2022, Glover starred in the FX series Atlanta, which he created and occasionally directed. For his work on Atlanta, Glover won various accolades, including two Primetime Emmy Awards and two Golden Globe Awards.

Glover has starred in several successful films including the supernatural horror The Lazarus Effect (2015), the comedy-drama Magic Mike XXL (2015), and science fiction film The Martian (2015). He played Aaron Davis in the superhero film Spider-Man: Homecoming (2017), and played Lando Calrissian in the space western Solo: A Star Wars Story (2018). He also provided the voice of adult Simba in The Lion King (2019). Glover is also a filmmaker, and starred in and produced the short film Guava Island (2019). In 2023, he co-created the comedy thriller Swarm. 

Following independently released albums and mixtapes, Glover signed with Glassnote Records in 2011, and released his first studio album, Camp, that year. In 2013, he followed this with his second album, Because the Internet. Glover's third album, "Awaken, My Love!" (2016), spawned the single "Redbone", which peaked at number twelve on the Billboard Hot 100 and eventually earned him his first Grammy Award. In 2018, Glover released "This Is America", which debuted at number-one on the Hot 100, and won four Grammy Awards, including for Song and Record of the Year. Glover's fourth album, 3.15.20, was released in 2020.

Early life
Donald McKinley Glover Jr. was born at Edwards Air Force Base in Edwards, California, on September 25, 1983, and was raised in Stone Mountain, Georgia, where his father was stationed. His mother, Beverly (née Smith), is a retired daycare provider, and his father, Donald Glover Sr., was a postal worker. His parents served as foster parents for 14 years. Glover was raised as a Jehovah's Witness, but he is no longer religious. His younger brother, Stephen, would later become a writer and producer who collaborates with him. He has a sister named Brianne.

Glover attended Avondale High School and DeKalb School of the Arts, and was voted "Most Likely to Write for The Simpsons" in his high school yearbook. In 2006, he graduated from the New York University Tisch School of the Arts with a degree in Dramatic Writing. While at Tisch, he self-produced the independent mixtape The Younger I Get, which has not been released and has been disowned by Glover for being the "too-raw ramblings" of what he calls a "decrepit Drake". He began DJing and producing electronic music under the moniker MC DJ (later as mcDJ) remixing Sufjan Stevens' album Illinois (2005).

Career

2006–2010: Derrick Comedy, Community, and mixtapes
In 2006 Glover caught the attention of producer David Miner after Glover sent writing samples including a spec script that he had written for The Simpsons. Miner and Tina Fey were impressed by Glover's work and hired him to become a writer for the NBC sitcom 30 Rock. From 2006 to 2009 Glover wrote for 30 Rock, in which he also had occasional appearances. He and his co-writers were presented with the Writers Guild of America Award for Best Comedy Series in 2008 for his work on the third season. In 2008, Glover unsuccessfully auditioned to play President Barack Obama on the sketch comedy program Saturday Night Live; the role went to cast member Fred Armisen. While attending NYU, Glover became a member of the sketch comedy group Derrick Comedy, having appeared in their sketches on YouTube since 2006, along with Dominic Dierkes, Meggie McFadden, DC Pierson, and Dan Eckman. The group wrote and starred in a feature-length film, Mystery Team, a comedy about amateur teenage detectives; it premiered at the Sundance Film Festival in 2009. With a limited release, the fans requested the film in their local theaters.

Glover starred as former high school jock Troy Barnes on Dan Harmon's NBC sitcom Community, which premiered in September 2009. Glover did not return as a full-time cast member for the show's fifth season, appearing only in the first five episodes. Despite speculation that he was leaving to pursue his music career, a series of hand-written notes that Glover posted to Instagram revealed that his reasons were more personal, citing a need for projects that offered him more independence as he worked through some personal issues. Although Harmon approached Glover about returning to the show for its sixth season, Glover declined, feeling that his character's return would not serve the show, the audience, or himself as an actor.

Glover's stage name, Childish Gambino, which he used to start his musical career, came from a Wu-Tang Clan name generator. In June 2008, he released the independent mixtape Sick Boi. In September 2009, he released his second mixtape Poindexter. A pair of mixtapes titled I Am Just a Rapper and I Am Just A Rapper 2, were released in close succession in 2010, and Culdesac, his third mixtape, was released in July of that year. In March 2010, Glover performed a 30-minute set on the stand-up showcase program Comedy Central Presents.

In May 2010, a fan suggested Glover for the role of Peter Parker in The Amazing Spider-Man film, encouraging his supporters to retweet the hashtag "#donald4spiderman". The campaign sparked a viral response on Twitter. The call for Glover to audition for the role was supported by Spider-Man creator Stan Lee. However, Glover did not audition, and the role went to Andrew Garfield. He later revealed that he was never contacted by Sony Pictures. Comics writer Brian Michael Bendis, who announced Miles Morales, an African-American version of Spider-Man, a year later, said he had conceived of the character before Glover's campaign went viral. Bendis gave credit to Glover for influencing the new hero's looks for Spider-Man; Bendis said, "I saw him in the costume [on Community] and thought, 'I would like to read that book. Glover later voiced this incarnation of Spider-Man on the Ultimate Spider-Man animated series.

Glover received the Rising Comedy Star award at the Just for Laughs festival in July 2010, and was featured in Gap's 2010 holiday advertising campaign.

2011–2014: Camp and Because the Internet

His first extended play, titled EP, was released as a free digital download in March 2011. A music video for the song "Freaks and Geeks" was released in that month and Glover hosted the MTVU Woodie Awards at South By Southwest. Glover commenced his nationwide IAMDONALD Tour in April. The tour was a one-man live show that consisted of rap, comedy, and video segments. Glover appeared at the 2011 Bonnaroo Music Festival as both Childish Gambino and as a comedian, performing a set with Bill Bailey. His one-hour stand-up special, Weirdo, aired on Comedy Central in November 2011.

For his 2011 debut studio album, Glover approached Community score composer, Ludwig Göransson for production assistance; Göransson has become his most frequent collaborator. Prior to its release, Glover signed with Glassnote Records and embarked on The Sign-Up Tour. The album titled Camp, was released on November 15, 2011, backed by his debut single "Bonfire" and "Heartbeat", which peaked at number eighteen on the Bubbling Under Hot 100 Singles and number fifty-four on Hot R&B/Hip-Hop Songs. Camp debuted at number eleven on the Billboard 200, selling 52,000 copies in the first week, and was generally well received by critics, with PopMatters writer Steve Lepore finding it to be "undoubtedly one of the best records of any genre to come out in 2011". His Camp Gambino tour was scheduled to commence in March 2012, but was postponed to April after he fractured his foot.

Glover released the songs "Eat Your Vegetables" and "Fuck Your Blog" through his website in April and May 2012. Throughout May and June, he premiered tracks from his sixth mixtape, Royalty, which was released as a free digital download in July. The album featured several artists, including his brother Stephen, under the alias Steve G. Lover III. The single "Trouble" by British artist Leona Lewis from her album Glassheart (2012) featured Gambino with a guest rap performance. The song peaked at number seven on the UK Singles Chart, making it his first UK Top 10 single. In November 2012, Göransson stated that he and Glover were in the studio generating new ideas for the next album which was to be "bigger" and "with more people involved". In 2013, Glover signed a deal to create a music-themed show for FX titled Atlanta, in which he would star, write, and serve as an executive producer. Although several networks were interested in picking up his half-hour comedy, he chose FX due to their willingness to work around his touring schedule. Glover had a supporting role in the romantic comedy The To Do List (2013), which performed below expectations, and guest starred in two episodes of the comedy-drama television series Girls in early 2013, as a Republican who is the brief love interest to Lena Dunham's character.

His second studio album, Because the Internet, finished recording in October 2013 and was released in December, debuting at number seven on the Billboard 200 chart. Because the Internet yielded the singles "3005", "Crawl" and "Sweatpants". "3005" peaked at number eight on the UK R&B Chart and sixty-four on the Billboard Hot 100. To promote the album, Glover wrote a short film Clapping for the Wrong Reasons which stars himself, Chance the Rapper, and Danielle Fishel among others. Directed by Hiro Murai, it was released prior the album's release and serves as its prelude. Additionally, a 72-page screenplay designed to sync up with the album was also released. The Recording Industry Association of America (RIAA) certified "Heartbeat" Gold for shipping 500,000 copies in June 2014 – making it Glover's first Gold certification. Because The Internet was also certified Gold. From February to May 2014, he embarked on The Deep Web Tour.

Glover directed the music video for the song "The Pressure" by Jhené Aiko, whose previous single, "Bed Peace", had featured a guest appearance by him. On October 2, he released a mixtape titled STN MTN and the following day an EP titled Kauai, which spawned the single "Sober". While STN MTN was a free download, the proceeds of Kauai went to law enforcement policies, maintenance and preservation of Kauai island. Glover described them as a joint project and the "first concept mixtape ever" that continues the story told in Camp and Because the Internet. At the 57th Annual Grammy Awards, Glover received his first Grammy nominations in Best Rap Album for Because the Internet and Best Rap Performance for "3005".

2015–2017: Film roles, Atlanta, and "Awaken, My Love!"
Glover appeared in three films in 2015. In The Lazarus Effect, he played a scientist working with a team of researchers who bring dead people back to life with disastrous consequences. Next, Glover played a singer in the comedy-drama Magic Mike XXL and performed a cover of the Bruno Mars song "Marry You" in the film, which was included in the soundtrack. His third release that year was Ridley Scott's science fiction adaptation The Martian, featuring Glover as a Jet Propulsion Laboratory astrodynamicist who helps rescue an astronaut, played by Matt Damon, stranded on Mars. Glover contributed to the soundtrack of Creed (2015), a film in the Rocky film series, providing vocals to the song "Waiting For My Moment" and co-writing another titled "Breathe".

After being in development since August 2013, FX ordered the Atlanta series in December 2014, announcing a 10-episode season in October 2015, which premiered on September 6, 2016, to widespread critical acclaim. Glover writes, occasionally directs, executive produces, and stars in the series as Earnest "Earn" Marks, a Princeton dropout who manages his rapper cousin as they navigate through the Atlanta hip hop scene. For his work on the show, Glover has earned various accolades, including Golden Globe Awards for Best Television Series – Musical or Comedy and Best Actor – Television Series Musical or Comedy and Primetime Emmy Awards for Outstanding Lead Actor in a Comedy Series and Outstanding Directing for a Comedy Series, making him the first black person to win an Emmy for the latter category. Due to the success of the series, FX signed Glover to an exclusive deal to write and produce more shows for the network. The first of these shows was an animated series featuring the Marvel Comics character Deadpool, which was set to premiere in 2018 but was later canceled due to creative differences. Glover later posted an unofficial and unproduced script to his Twitter account, stating he was not "too busy to work on Deadpool", ending media speculation.

In September 2016, Glover held three musical performances, known as the "Pharos Experience", in Joshua Tree, California, where he debuted songs from his third studio album "Awaken, My Love!". The album was released in December, charting at number five on the Billboard 200 and was later certified platinum accumulating 1,000,000 certified units. It was considered a bold departure from his usual hip hop style as it primarily featured Glover singing rather than rapping, and saw him draw influences from psychedelic soul, funk and R&B music, particularly of the funk band Funkadelic. "Awaken, My Love!" produced the singles "Me and Your Mama", "Redbone" (which peaked at number twelve on the Billboard Hot 100), and "Terrified". Its vinyl release featured a virtual reality headset and an accompanying app that allowed owners to access virtual reality live performances from the Pharos Experience. The album was positively received by music critics and was nominated for both the 2018 Grammy Award for Album of the Year and Best Urban Contemporary Album, while "Redbone" won Best Traditional R&B Performance and received nominations for Record of the Year and Best R&B Song. Glover performed "Terrified" at the award show's 60th ceremony.

In 2017, Glover appeared as criminal Aaron Davis in the superhero film Spider-Man: Homecoming (2017). Davis is the uncle of the Miles Morales version of Spider-Man, whom Glover had voiced in the Ultimate Spider-Man animated series. The casting was described as "a surprise treat for fans" by the film's director Jon Watts, aware of his 2010 campaign to portray the superhero. In April 2017, Time named Glover in its annual "100 Most Influential People in the World". Tina Fey wrote the entry for Glover, stating that he "embodies his generation's belief that people can be whatever they want and change what it is they want, at any time".

Glover announced his intention to retire the Childish Gambino stage name in June 2017, telling the audience at Governors Ball Music Festival, "I'll see you for the last Gambino album" before walking off stage. He further explained his decision in an interview, feeling his musical career was no longer "necessary" and added "There's nothing worse than like a third sequel" and "I like it when something's good and when it comes back there's a reason to come back, there's a reason to do that."

2018–2020: "This Is America" and 3.15.20
Glover signed with RCA Records in January 2018, which Glover called "a necessary change of pace". In May 2018, he released a single titled "This Is America" while performing as both host and musical guest on Saturday Night Live. The song debuted at number one, becoming both Glover's first number one and top ten single in the United States. It features him singing and rapping, drawing influence from trap music. The lyrics addressed a variety of topics including gun violence and being black in the United States, while its controversial video, directed by Japanese filmmaker and frequent collaborator Hiro Murai, showed Glover with a firearm shooting at a choir. "This is America" won the Grammy for Song of the Year, Best Music Video, Best Rap/Sung Performance and Record of the Year, becoming the first rap song to win the latter.

While filming Atlanta second season, Glover portrayed a young version of Lando Calrissian in Solo: A Star Wars Story (2018), causing him to miss appearances in some episodes; Calrissian was previously played by Billy Dee Williams in two films in the original Star Wars trilogy. Despite the film's turbulent production and poor box office returns, Glover's performance was praised, particularly by critic Stephanie Zacharek for his "unruly, charismatic elegance". In July 2018, Glover released the Summer Pack extended play containing the songs "Summertime Magic" and "Feels Like Summer", the former of which was originally meant to be the lead single from Glover's forthcoming fourth studio album. "Summertime Magic" debuted at forty-four on the Billboard Hot 100. Glover began his fifth concert tour, This Is America Tour in September, announcing it would be his last during its opening show in Atlanta. Two previously unreleased songs, "Algorhythm" and "All Night", were made available to people who bought tickets to the tour.

In February 2018, Glover approached New Regency, without a script, about a project he would like to work on while he had free time between Solo promotional duties and his This Is America Tour. Due to his previous success, they accepted his offer quickly and Amazon Studios agreed to distribute the film. Guava Island, the resulting film written by Stephen Glover and directed by Hiro Murai, was filmed in Cuba. It stars Glover as a musician who decides to throw a festival on his homeland, with Rihanna co-starring as his partner and muse. It was released in 2019 through Amazon Prime Video to generally favorable critical appraisal after premiering at Coachella. Glover provided guest vocals to the track "Monster" on 21 Savage's 2018 album I Am > I Was, reflecting on his negative feelings toward the music industry and why he wants to retire from music. He partnered with Adidas Originals to reimagine three pairs of classic Adidas sneakers, which were launched in April 2019 under the "Donald Glover Presents" line and were promoted by a series of advertisements starring comedian Mo'Nique.

Days after headlining Coachella in April 2019, Glover premiered a new song, "Algorythm", through the mobile app Pharos AR. The augmented reality application allows users to open the virtual Pharos world with other players. During his headlining performance at the 2019 Outside Lands Music and Arts Festival, Glover drew "the biggest crowd that Outside Lands has ever had" and also announced that it was "the second to last show that we'll be doing" before retiring the Childish Gambino pseudonym. When asked on Jimmy Kimmel Live! about the status of retiring, Glover said he was unsure and may continue to perform after the This Is America Tour. Glover was expected to release another album per the RCA Records contract he signed in January 2018.

Glover provided the voice for adult Simba, the titular protagonist and lion prince turned king in The Lion King (2019), a remake of the 1994 Disney film of the same name. Glover praised the director, Jon Favreau, for the way he constructed the timeless story and asked him to re-record his lines as he connected to the film's story line more personally after his father's death. Glover sang on the film's soundtrack and on the curated album The Lion King: The Gift, featuring songs inspired by the film. Despite receiving mixed reviews, the film grossed $1.6 billion worldwide, making it one of the highest-grossing films of all time. In December 2019, Glover endorsed 2020 Democratic candidate Andrew Yang and joined his campaign as a creative consultant.

On March 15, 2020, Glover streamed his surprise fourth album on his website Donald Glover Presents, where it played on a loop for twelve hours until it was taken down. 21 Savage and Ariana Grande feature on the album. The album was released on digital services the following week under the name 3.15.20. It was well received by music critics and debuted at number 13 on the Billboard 200. In November 2020, in a rare appearance on his Twitter account, Glover opined that seasons 3 and 4 of Atlanta would be on the caliber of The Sopranos and that his next musical project would be his "biggest by far".

2021–present: Return to television and Swarm
In 2021, Donald Glover signed an overall deal with Amazon Studios. It was announced that he would be producing and starring in a television reboot of Doug Liman's 2005 film Mr. & Mrs. Smith, with Maya Erskine co-starring. In April 2021, Glover tweeted that he was in the midst of writing a trilogy of feature films.

In February 2022, both seasons 3 and 4 of Atlanta had completed filming, with season 3 premiering on March 24 and the final season on September 15. In March, Glover announced that he was working on a Disney+ Star Wars series based on Lando Calrissian. 

In an October 2022 interview with Variety, "Community" creator Dan Harmon said that he believes Donald Glover would be in the upcoming Sony Pictures and Peacock TV produced "Community" film. “I think that Donald is coming, based on word of mouth, but it’s just the deal isn’t official or wasn’t official. It would be difficult to really commit to doing this thing without Donald,” Harmon said. “So I believe he is coming back." In December 2022, it was announced that Glover would star and produce a feature set in Sony Pictures’ Spider-Man universe. The film currently has no title but is said to revolve around the Hypno-Hustler.

He is also the creator of the television series, titled Swarm, starring Dominique Fishback, Damson Idris, and Chloe Bailey, about a Beyoncé-esque character. Serving as a director and executive producer, the series is the first project from his deal with Amazon Studios.

Influences 
In an interview with The Guardian, Glover stated, "I'm influenced by LCD Soundsystem as much as Ghostface Killah. A lot of the rap shows I saw as a kid were boring, but if you went to a Rage Against the Machine show or a Justice show, the kids were losing their minds. Kids just want to go nuts, Odd Future know that. People want to experience something physical." Glover also cites hip-hop duo Outkast and trio Migos, and funk band Funkadelic as being influences.

Glover has influenced a number of younger musicians and actors. Rapper Vince Staples has praised Glover's ability to "[do] something different every time".

Personal life
Glover began dating Michelle White in 2015. They have three sons, born in early 2016, January 2018, and 2020.

Glover is known as a private person and rarely posts on social media or does interviews unless for promotional work. In an interview with The New Yorker, he stated that social media made him feel "less human" and that he only visits online discussion pages in which he can stay anonymous and communicate with people who understand what he is saying.

On December 17, 2018, during the final stop for the This Is America Tour, Glover announced that his father had died. He said, "I lost my father a couple weeks ago and I wanted to play him some of the new songs but he didn't want to hear them, because he was like, 'I know they're going to be great.

Discography

 Camp (2011)
 Because the Internet (2013)
 "Awaken, My Love!" (2016)
 3.15.20 (2020)

Tours
Comedy tours
 IAMDONALD Tour (2011)

Musical tours
 The Sign-Up Tour (2011)
 Camp Gambino Tour (2012)
 Deep Web Tour (2014)
 This Is America Tour (2018)

Filmography

Film

Television

Music videos

Web

References

External links

 
 Donald Glover on YouTube
 
 
 
 
 2018 Profile of Glover on BBC Radio Four

1983 births
Living people
21st-century American comedians
21st-century American male actors
21st-century American rappers
21st-century American singers
African-American film producers
African-American male actors
African-American male comedians
African-American male rappers
African-American record producers
African-American screenwriters
African-American songwriters
African-American television producers
Alternative hip hop musicians
American comedy musicians
American film producers
American hip hop record producers
American hip hop singers
American male comedians
American male film actors
American male screenwriters
American male television actors
American male television writers
American male voice actors
American stand-up comedians
American television directors
American television writers
Best Musical or Comedy Actor Golden Globe (television) winners
Comedians from California
Comedians from Georgia (U.S. state)
Former Jehovah's Witnesses
Glassnote Records artists
Grammy Award winners
Male actors from California
Male actors from Georgia (U.S. state)
Male actors from Los Angeles County, California
Outstanding Performance by a Lead Actor in a Comedy Series Primetime Emmy Award winners
People from Kern County, California
People from Lancaster, California
People from San Bernardino County, California
People from Stone Mountain, Georgia
Rappers from California
Rappers from Georgia (U.S. state)
Rappers from Los Angeles
RCA Records artists
Record producers from California
Screenwriters from California
Screenwriters from Georgia (U.S. state)
Songwriters from California
Songwriters from Georgia (U.S. state)
Southern hip hop musicians
Television producers from California
Television producers from Georgia (U.S. state)
Tisch School of the Arts alumni
Writers Guild of America Award winners
American tenors